Gati or GATI may refer to:
 Gati Ltd, an Indian courier delivery services company
 Gati, Nepal, a village
 Gati, Iran, a village
 gati, a term for the subdivisions of the Desire realm in Buddhist cosmology
 GATI, the Gender and Trade Initiative
 Cyclone Gati, a 2020 cyclone that hit Somalia

People with the name 
 Maurizio Di Gati (born 1966), Sicilian mafioso
 Kathleen Gati (born 1957), American-Canadian actress
 Toby T. Gati (born 1946), former US Assistant Secretary of State for Intelligence and Research
 Gati Krushna Misra (1911–1992), Indian Chief Justice

See also 
 Gatti
 Garti (disambiguation)
 Ghati
 Gatis, a Lithuanian name